Waiteville is an unincorporated community in Monroe County, West Virginia, United States. Waiteville is located near the Virginia border, southeast of Union. Waiteville had a post office, which closed on July 11, 2009.

References

Unincorporated communities in Monroe County, West Virginia
Unincorporated communities in West Virginia